Tomalty is a surname. Notable people with the surname include:

 Glenn Tomalty (born 1954), Canadian ice hockey player
 Jonas Tomalty (born 1979), Canadian vocalist

See also
 Tumulty, surname